Matthieu Le Carpentier (born on September 22, 1981 in Hérouville-Saint-Clair), known professionally as Skread, is a French hip hop record producer and composer. He is the co-founder in 2006 of the record label 7th Magnitude, with his partner "Ablaye" Abdoulaye Doucouré, which Orelsan and Gringe are signed to. His nickname Skread is a slang word that means "discreet".

Career
He started his career in 2004 by producing on the most significant albums of the period (Booba, Diam's, Rohff) winning song of the year award in 2006 with Diams  and producing several tracks on multi-platinum and diamond selling albums. In 2008 he decided to focus on Orelsan, his artist signed on his own label called 7th Magnitude.

Orelsan's first solo album Perdu d'avance released in 2009 and fully produced by Skread went platinum. His second act in 2011, Le chant des sirènes mainly produced by Skread went 2 times platinum  and won 2 awards for best rap album, and audience choice award.

After a year and a half of European tour with Orelsan, Skread produced in 2013 the album of Casseurs Flowters (Orelsan and Gringe) that went platinum. In 2015 he produced the music and played in Orelsan's movie Comment c’est loin released in theaters in France, Belgium and Switzerland. The movie OST performed by Casseurs Flowters and produced by Skread went also twice platinum.

In 2017 he produced Orelsan's third solo album La fête est finie featuring artists like Stromae, Dizzee Rascal, Nekfeu, Maitre Gims, Ibeyi, Eugy and Kojo Funds. The album went platinum the first week  and became 9 times platinum (more than 900k)

The last album won 4 awards for "Best rap album", "Best tour". Male artist of the Year" and "Video of the Year" for the track "Basique" produced by Skread.

Skread was on stage during the worldwide sold-out tour that hits 50 festivals, 28 arenas in Europe, including 4 Accor Hotel Arenas in Paris.

On this project Skread especially produced the tracks "Basique" (certified diamond with more than 50M streams and 82M views), "Reves Bizarres" featuring Damso (certified platinum and 47M views) co-produced « Tout va bien » with Stromae as well as 5 other certified platinums singles. He also produced "Tout ce que je sais" featuring YBN Cordae. The same year, he executive produced the album "Afro Trap Volume 1" hosted by MHD, that features Aya Nakamura, Dj Arafat, Sidiki Diabaté, Sarkodie and Kiff no beat.

In 2018, Skread produced the tracks "Alhadji baller" and "Pepperdem" on Shirazee's EP Home and away which featured Saint Jhn and Eugy released on 7th Magnitude and Juss different.

In 2020, Skread has produced "23" from Burna Boy's new album Twice as Tall  and is announced on a track featuring himself and Chris Brown and Dadju on the No limit album.

Discography
Compilation albums
 2005 – Instrus 2013 – Instrus 2.0''

Production

The following is a list of albums in which Skread has produced as either producer or co-producer, showing year released, performing artists and album name.

Filmography

References

External links
 Skread on Skyrock
 

1981 births
Living people
Musicians from Caen
French record producers
French composers
French male composers
French songwriters
Male songwriters